The Ephraim United Order Cooperative Building is a historic commercial building in downtown Ephraim, Utah, United States, that is listed on the National Register of Historic Places.

Description

The building is located at 96 North Main Street (U.S. Route 89), on the corner with East 100 North. It was built in 1871-72 to house a Mormon cooperative store in community. The store was established to avoid trading with "gentile" (non-Mormon) merchants, and sold merchandise from the ZCMI co-op in Salt Lake City. The two-story stone building housed a co-op store on the ground floor and a meeting hall on the upper level. In 1888 the Sanpete Stake Academy was established, using the meeting hall for classes; it became Snow College in 1917.

The front of the building is clad in white oolitic Sanpete limestone on the front with coarser building stone on the other elevations. A steeply-pitched roof runs from front to back with bracketed eaves and eave returns over the three-bay front elevation. The side elevations are four bays wide, with a one-story extension to the rear. The building features the inscription "Ephraim U.O. Mercantile Institution" and a beehive surrounded by "Holiness to the Lord" in an arched panel on the building's front gable. A similarly-constructed stone granary stands nearby on the site.

The building was placed on the National Register of Historic Places on March 20, 1973. After restoration work the store is operated as a gift shop.

See also

 National Register of Historic Places listings in Sanpete County, Utah

References

External links

 

Commercial buildings on the National Register of Historic Places in Utah
Buildings and structures completed in 1871
Buildings and structures in Sanpete County, Utah
Historic American Buildings Survey in Utah
Former cooperatives of the United States
National Register of Historic Places in Sanpete County, Utah